Campanula spicata, common name the spiked bellflower, is a herbaceous biennial or perennial plant of the genus Campanula belonging to the family Campanulaceae.

Etymology
The genus Latin name (“campanula”), meaning small bell, refers to the bell-shape of the flower, while the specific epithet (“spicata”) refers to the spike-shaped inflorescence.

Description
 Campanula spicata has its overwintering buds situated just below the soil surface (hemicryptophyte) and a stalk growing directly from the ground (scapose). This plant reaches on average  in height. The stem is erect, striate and hairy, the basal leaves are petiolated, narrowly lanceolate,  with toothed and wavy margins, the cauline leaves are smaller, acuminate and semiamplexicaul. The numerous flowers are arranged in a more or less dense and long spikes. They are blue-purple, 15 to 25 millimeters long and bell-shaped to funnel-shaped. These flowers are sessile and grow in the axils of triangular bracts. The calyx lobes are hairy, lanceolate, and about one third as long as the flower. The flowering period extends from June to August.

Distribution
This plant is endemic in the south and central Alps, in the Apennines and in the Balkan Peninsula.

Habitat

Gallery

References

 Pignatti S. - Flora d'Italia – Edagricole – 1982, Vol. II, pag. 691
 A. Bernini, G. Marconi e F. Polani - Campanule d'Italia e dei territori limitrofi - Ediz. Verba & Scripta 2002

External links

 Biolib
 Campanula spicata
 Botanicatalog

spicata
Plants described in 1753
Taxa named by Carl Linnaeus